Spornovo is a rural locality (a village) in Andreyevskoye Rural Settlement, Alexandrovsky District, Vladimir Oblast, Russia. The population was 138 as of 2010.

Geography 
Spornovo is located 41 km northeast of Alexandrov (the district's administrative centre) by road. Podvyazye is the nearest rural locality.

References 

Rural localities in Alexandrovsky District, Vladimir Oblast